Gabriel Bularda (born 26 June 1954) is a Romanian rower. He competed in the men's coxed pair event at the 1980 Summer Olympics.

References

1954 births
Living people
Romanian male rowers
Olympic rowers of Romania
Rowers at the 1980 Summer Olympics
People from Vaslui County